Events in the year 1937 in Mongolia.

Incumbents
President: Dansranbilegiin Dogsom
Prime Minister: Anandyn Amar

Events

Births

Deaths
August 22 - Gelegdorjiin Demid
November 26 - Peljidiin Genden

1930s in Mongolia